Witmer Stone (September 22, 1866 – May 24, 1939) was an American ornithologist, botanist, and mammalogist, and was considered one of the last of the “great naturalists.” Stone is remembered principally as an ornithologist.  He was president of the American Ornithologists’ Union (AOU) 1920–23, and was editor of the AOU's periodical The Auk 1912–1936.  He spearheaded the production of the 4th edition of the AOU checklist, published in 1931.  He worked for over 50 years in the Ornithology Department at the Academy of Natural Sciences of Philadelphia, eventually serving as Director of the institution.  Stone was one of the founding members of the Delaware Valley Ornithological Club (DVOC) in 1890 and was actively involved in the organization for the remainder of his life.  Stone was one of only two scientists (Joseph Grinnell was the other) to serve as president of both the AOU and the American Society of Mammalogists, and he co-authored two popular books about mammals.  His outstanding botanical contribution was The Plants of Southern New Jersey, published in 1911.  Stone spent many summers at Cape May, New Jersey, summering there annually starting in 1916. He is best remembered for his two-volume classic Bird Studies at Old Cape May, which was published by the DVOC in 1937, two years before his death.

Early life 
Witmer Stone was born in Philadelphia, Pennsylvania, on September 22, 1866, to Anne Eveline (née Witmer) and Frederick Dawson Stone.  According to longtime friend, Cornelius Weygandt, Witmer Stone was “of the Chester County Quaker-Pennsylvania Dutch cross that has given us so many of our botanists and ornithologists, paleontologists and chemists.” Stone showed an early interest in all things natural, and was an inveterate collector.  Stone was a boyhood friend and schoolmate of two of the Brown brothers: Amos Brown later became a geology professor at University of Pennsylvania, and Stewardson Brown became the Curator of the Department of Botany at the Academy of Natural Sciences of Philadelphia.  Stone and his brother, Frederick, and three of the Brown brothers formed the “Wilson Natural Science Association”, named in honor of the pioneering American ornithologist Alexander Wilson. Stone also spent time exploring the woods and fields around his grandmother's Chester County, Pennsylvania home. Stone married Lillie May Lafferty on August 1, 1904; they had no children.

Stone graduated from Germantown Academy in 1883. He obtained an A.B. degree from the University of Pennsylvania (UP), then in March 1888 was appointed a Jessup Fund Student at the Academy of Natural Sciences of Philadelphia, when Dr. Joseph Leidy was the academy's president.  The academy established an ornithology department in 1891, the same year that Stone completed an A.M. degree at UP. (UP later conferred an honorary ScD. on Stone in 1913, and presented him with the Alumni Award of Merit in 1937.) Stone participated in Academy-sponsored collecting expeditions to Bermuda in 1888 and to Mexico in 1890.

The Academy of Natural Sciences of Philadelphia
Stone visited the Academy of Natural Sciences many times while growing up, and later worked there for 51 years. Stone inherited an ornithological specimens collection that had not been cared for properly, and spearheaded heroic efforts to salvage this and collections from other fields. Some specimens were historically valuable, including types described by pioneering ornithologists and mammalogists. The size of the academy's bird collection increased fivefold during Stone's tenure, from 26,000 specimens to 143,000.

From 1893 to 1908 Stone was Assistant Curator at the academy; Curator 1908–1918 and Executive Curator 1918–1925; Director 1925–1928; Curator of Vertebrates, 1918–1936; and lastly, three titles (with year of appointment) that Stone held at the time of his death: Vice President (1927), Emeritus Director (1928), and Honorary Curator of Birds (1938).

As a botanist 

Stone was an original member of the Philadelphia Botanical Club.  He had a knowledge of systematics of the local flora “surpassed only by that of Simon-pure botanists,” and, according to a later eminent botanist, Frans Stafleu, Stone's concentration on ornithology was a “definite loss” for botany.  Stone produced 20 botanical writings during his lifetime.

After a joint meeting of the Philadelphia and Torrey Botanical Clubs to Toms River, New Jersey, in early July 1900, Stone resolved to write a flora of the New Jersey Pine Barrens.  Over the next decade Stone made hundreds of collecting trips to southern New Jersey.  His research culminated in his botanical pièce-de-résistance, The Plants of Southern New Jersey, published in 1911, which “is the only comprehensive floristic treatment for southern New Jersey and it continues to be used today [2002].”
	
The Academy of Natural Sciences preserves many botanical specimens that Witmer Stone collected circa 1910, including many from New Jersey. The Mid-Atlantic Herbarium Consortium was leading a project to digitize herbarium records from the Mid-Atlantic region through volunteer crowd-sourcing as of 2020.

As an ornithologist 

Stone's first manuscript to appear in a “serious” publication was “The Turkey Buzzard Breeding in Pennsylvania” in American Naturalist in 1885.  His first note in The Auk was “A migration of hawks at Germantown, Pennsylvania” in 1887.  Stone was a founding member of the Delaware Valley Ornithological Club (DVOC) in 1890, and  authored the DVOC's The Birds of Eastern Pennsylvania and New Jersey, which was published in 1894 and put both him and the club on the ornithological map.  He wrote The Birds of New Jersey, Their Nests and Eggs, published in 1909.  His ornithological publications run into the hundreds; a search on the Searchable Ornithological Research Archive website turns up approximately 125 articles and notes in The Auk alone.
	
Witmer Stone had a long association with the American Ornithologists’ Union (AOU).  He was elected an Associate in 1885; a Fellow in 1892; and a member of the council in 1898.  He served as chairman of the AOU Committee on Bird Protection 1896–1901; as a member (from 1901) and later as Chairman (1915–1931) of the AOU Committee on Classification and Nomenclature of North American Birds; and as editor of The Auk 1912–1936 (after editing the DVOC's Cassinia for ten years).  Stone was vice-president of the AOU 1914–1920, and President 1920–1923.  He chaired the committee which produced the 4th edition of the AOU checklist, published in 1931.

Stone was an honorary member of many foreign ornithological societies, the Nuttall Ornithological Club, the Cooper Ornithological Club, and the Zoological Society of Philadelphia (Stone was also Director of the latter). He was awarded the Otto Hermann Medal of the Hungarian Ornithological Society in 1931 and was a member of the International Commission on Zoological Nomenclature, the Advisory Committee of the National Audubon Society, and the American Philosophical Society. He was also President of the Pennsylvania Audubon Society.

Bird Studies at Old Cape May 
For all of his work as one of the preeminent ornithologists of his day, Stone's most enduring popular legacy is undoubtedly his charming Bird Studies at Old Cape May (BSOCM), originally published by the Delaware Valley Ornithological Club (DVOC) in 1937. This was an ornithological history of the New Jersey coast, with an emphasis on Cape May County, particularly the coastal areas.  The bulk of the work consists of species accounts of all the birds that had been found in Cape May County at the time of the writing, with their historical occurrence in the state and notes on seasonality, habits, behavior, etc. gleaned from Stone's own notes and the records of fellow DVOC members. Stone dedicated Bird Studies at Old Cape May to his wife. Stone first visited Cape May in August 1890, and spent most of July–August 1891 there. He made frequent trips there over the years, and became an annual summer resident starting in 1916 and continuing until at least 1937. The largest photograph of Stone hangs in the Cape May Bird Observatory’s Center for Research and Education in Goshen, NJ. 
	
Stone was posthumously awarded the Brewster Medal by the American Ornithologists’ Union in 1939 for BSOCM. The DVOC published 1,400 two-volume sets of BSOCM (see the DVOC website for information about the original DVOC editions).  Dover Publications (1965) and Stackpole Books (2000) have both published editions of BSOCM; however, both editions are now out of print.

References

Further reading 

History of the DVOC.
McConnell, Scott. Witmer Stone: The Fascination of Nature. Self-published, 2014.

Stone, Witmer. Bird Studies at Old Cape May. Stackpole Books. 2000.
Sutton, Clay and Pat. Birds and Birding at Cape May. Stackpole Books. 2006.

American ornithologists
1866 births
1939 deaths
People from Cape May, New Jersey
Scientists from Philadelphia
University of Pennsylvania alumni
Germantown Academy alumni
Burials at Laurel Hill Cemetery (Philadelphia)
Members of the American Philosophical Society